The 1922 Rhode Island gubernatorial election was held on November 7, 1922. Democratic nominee William S. Flynn defeated Republican nominee Harold J. Gross with 51.72% of the vote.

General election

Candidates
Major party candidates
William S. Flynn, Democratic 
Harold J. Gross, Republican

Other candidates
Charles F. Bishop, Socialist Labor
George W. Miller, Independent

Results

References

1922
Rhode Island
Gubernatorial